Carrie Artiemissia Snowden (January 16, 1900 – September 5, 1985), known professionally as Carolynne Snowden, was an American actress, dancer, and singer who broke new ground for black people working in the entertainment industry.

Biography
Carolynne was born in Oakland, California, to Frederick Snowden and Nellie Derrick. Early on in her career, she performed on the theater circuit, traveling the country and earning acclaim. She was singing and dancing at New York City's famous Cotton Club by the early 1920s.

By 1925, she had relocated to Los Angeles to perform at the New Cotton Club and at Club Alabam on Central Avenue; she slowly began to get small roles in Hollywood films like The Marriage Clause and The Merry Widow. Eventually she signed a five-year contract with John M. Stahl's Tiffany Pictures, which led to a bigger role in 1927's In Old Kentucky alongside Stepin Fetchit.

Carolynne left Hollywood around 1933 after her Tiffany contract was up, taking her show on the road and refocusing her efforts on singing and dancing. She died in 1985 in Los Angeles, and was survived by her husband Manfred Montagu and her daughter, Esther Smith.

Selected filmography
 A Day at the Races (1937)
 The Green Pastures (1936)
 Strike Me Pink (1936) 
 Murder at the Vanities (1934) 
 Flying Down to Rio (1933)
 The Sport Parade (1932)
 Honey (1930)
 Playing Around (1930)
 On with the Show! (1929)
 Fox Movietone Follies of 1929 (1929)
 Innocents of Paris (1929)
 Show Boat (1929)
 The Wedding March (1928)
 Sweet Sixteen (1928)
 Nameless Men (1928)
 The Devil's Skipper (1928)
 In Old Kentucky (1927)
 The Jazz Singer (1927)
 Orchids and Ermine (1927)
 The Marriage Clause (1926)
 The First Year (1926)
 The Gilded Butterfly (1926)
 The Marriage Clause (1926)
 The Merry Widow (1925)

References

Further reading
 Calvin, Floyd. "California Movie Star Doing Broadway: Carolynne Snowden, Slender and Lovely, Is Crazy About Dolls and, of Course, Her Art". The Pittsburgh Courier. October 22, 1927. Page 13.
 Cavanaugh, Irene. "'Creole Queen' Steals Show at Lincoln House". Los Angeles Daily News. January 7, 1930. Page 20.
 Robertson, Stanley. "LA Confidential: A Face From Out of the Past; Still Radiating Charm". Los Angeles Sentinel. March 14, 1957. Page A5.
 "Urban League Members Are Planning Ball". The California Eagle. May 30, 1957. Page 8.
 "Carolynne Snowden Shares Doll Collection". Los Angeles Sentinel. December 9, 1982. Page C-2.

External links
 

1900 births
1985 deaths
20th-century American actresses
20th-century American dancers
20th-century American singers
African-American actresses
African-American female dancers
20th-century African-American women singers
American film actresses
American musical theatre actresses
African Americans in California
Actresses from Oakland, California